Bilel Saidani (born 29 June 1993) is a Tunisian professional footballer who plays as a midfielder for the Tunisian national team.

Professional career
Saidani made his professional debut with Bizentin in a 1-0 Qatar Stars League loss to ES Tunis on 26 September 2013. On 28 January 2019, Saidani transferred to the Qatari club Al-Sailiya.

International career
Saidani made his professional debut for the Tunisia national football team in a 1-0 friendly loss to Algeria on 26 March 2019.

References

External links
 
 

1993 births
Living people
People from Bizerte
Tunisian footballers
Tunisia international footballers
CA Bizertin players
Al-Sailiya SC players
Damac FC players
Tunisian Ligue Professionnelle 1 players
Qatar Stars League players
Saudi Professional League players
Tunisian expatriate footballers
Expatriate footballers in Qatar
Expatriate footballers in Saudi Arabia
Tunisian expatriate sportspeople in Qatar
Tunisian expatriate sportspeople in Saudi Arabia
Association football midfielders